795 Fini (prov. designation:  or ) is a dark and large background asteroid, approximately  in diameter, located in the central region of the asteroid belt. It was discovered by Austrian astronomer Johann Palisa at the Vienna Observatory on 26 September 1914. The carbonaceous C-type asteroid has a poorly determined rotation period of 9.3 hours and seems rather spherical in shape. Any reference of the asteroid's name to a person is unknown.

Orbit and classification 

Fini is a non-family asteroid of the main belt's background population when applying the hierarchical clustering method to its proper orbital elements. It orbits the Sun in the central main-belt at a distance of 2.5–3.0 AU once every 4 years and 7 months (1,665 days; semi-major axis of 2.75 AU). Its orbit has an eccentricity of 0.10 and an inclination of 19° with respect to the ecliptic. The body's observation arc begins at Vienna Observatory on 16 March 1917, where it was officially discovered two and a half years before.

Naming 

"Fini" is an Austrian diminutive of Josephine. Any reference of this minor planet name to a person or occurrence is unknown.

Unknown meaning 

Among the many thousands of named minor planets, Fini is one of 120 asteroids for which no official naming citation has been published. All of these asteroids have low numbers, the first being . They were discovered between 1876 and the 1930s, predominantly by astronomers Auguste Charlois, Johann Palisa, Max Wolf and Karl Reinmuth.

Physical characteristics 

In the Tholen classification, Fini is a common, carbonaceous C-type asteroid. It is also a C-type in the taxonomic classification based on near-infrared colors from the MOVIS-catalog, which was created from data gathered by the VISTA Hemisphere Survey conducted with the VISTA telescope at Paranal Observatory in Chile.

Rotation period 

Several rotational lightcurves of Fini have been obtained from photometric observations. However, the asteroid, which shows a notably low brightness variation – indicative of a spherical rather than elongated shape – still has a poorly determined rotation period.

Petr Pravec and Peter Kušnirák at Ondřejov Observatory derive a rotation period of  hours from their observations in October 2001, or half of Warner's period solution, also with an amplitude of 0.2 magnitude.

Diameter and albedo 

The Collaborative Asteroid Lightcurve Link adopts Petr Pravec's revised WISE-data, that is an albedo of 0.0553 and a diameter of 62.56 kilometers based on an absolute magnitude of 9.78. These timed observations are taken when the asteroid passes in front of a distant star.

Notes

References

External links 
 Lightcurve Database Query (LCDB), at www.minorplanet.info
 Dictionary of Minor Planet Names, Google books
 Asteroids and comets rotation curves, CdR – Geneva Observatory, Raoul Behrend
 Discovery Circumstances: Numbered Minor Planets (1)-(5000) – Minor Planet Center
 
 

000795
Discoveries by Johann Palisa
Named minor planets
000795
19140926